Province Island is an island mostly in the Canadian province of Québec, but partly in the U.S. state of Vermont. It is situated in Lake Memphremagog. Although  (9%) at its southern point is part of the United States (in the town of Derby, Vermont), the greater part belongs to the municipality of Ogden, Quebec, in Memphrémagog Regional County Municipality, Quebec. At the end of the 18th century a pioneer named Martin Adams and his wife built a house on the island, where they grew flax and vegetables. It is under private ownership; a pheasant hunt is organized annually. The Canada–United States border is marked by a five-meter strip cut through the forest. The island has been noted for its shape's similarity to the island of Taiwan.

References

Landforms of Estrie
Landforms of Orleans County, Vermont
Lake islands of Quebec
Lake islands of Vermont
International islands
Derby, Vermont
Magog, Quebec